Victoria Foley is an American politician who served as a member of the Maine House of Representatives for the 12th district from 2018 to 2020. She is also a former member of the Biddeford City Council.

Early life and education 
Foley was born in Portland, Maine, and earned a Bachelor of Arts in journalism from University of King's College in 2005.

Career 
In 2018, former State Representative for Maine's 12th district, Marty Grohman, chose not to seek reelection to the seat. Foley ran for the open seat, defeated fellow Democrat John Eder in the June 2018 primary with 57.2% of the vote, and was unopposed in the general election. She is running for re-election in 2020. Foley was unopposed in the 2018 general election for the 12th district seat.

In July 2021, Foley declared her candidacy for mayor of Biddeford, Maine. She was defeated by incumbent Mayor Alan Casavant.

Personal life 
Foley lives in Biddeford, Maine, with her husband Kevin Rooney.

References 

Year of birth missing (living people)
Living people
Democratic Party members of the Maine House of Representatives
21st-century American politicians
Politicians from Biddeford, Maine
Women state legislators in Maine
University of King's College alumni
21st-century American women politicians